Harrison Township is one of the fourteen townships of Perry County, Ohio, United States.  The 2000 census found 5,399 people in the township, 1,745 of whom lived in the unincorporated portions of the township.

Geography
Located in the northeastern part of the county, it borders the following townships:
Newton Township, Muskingum County - north
Clay Township, Muskingum County - northeast
York Township, Morgan County - southeast
Bearfield Township - south
Pike Township - southwest
Clayton Township - west

Several populated places are located in Harrison Township:
The village of Crooksville, in the east
Part of the village of Roseville, in the far northeast along the border with Muskingum County
The unincorporated community of Milligan, in the south

Name and history
Harrison Township was organized in 1820, and named for William Henry Harrison, an Ohio legislator and afterward 5th President of the United States. It is one of nineteen Harrison Townships statewide.

Government
The township is governed by a three-member board of trustees, who are elected in November of odd-numbered years to a four-year term beginning on the following January 1. Two are elected in the year after the presidential election and one is elected in the year before it. There is also an elected township fiscal officer, who serves a four-year term beginning on April 1 of the year after the election, which is held in November of the year before the presidential election. Vacancies in the fiscal officership or on the board of trustees are filled by the remaining trustees.

References

External links
County website

Townships in Perry County, Ohio
Townships in Ohio
1820 establishments in Ohio
Populated places established in 1820